Marko Kivenmäki is a Finnish ice hockey player who played professionally in SM-liiga for Ässät, Lukko and TPS. He also played in GET-ligaen for Frisk Asker.

Personal life
His son Otto Kivenmäki was drafted 191st overall by the Detroit Red Wings in the 2018 NHL Entry Draft.

References

External links

Living people
Frisk Asker Ishockey players
Ässät players
Lukko players
HC TPS players
1975 births
Finnish ice hockey forwards